{{safesubst:SUBPAGENAME}} (stylized as co:here) is a Canadian startup that provides natural language processing models that help companies improve human-machine interactions. Cohere was founded in 2019 by Aidan Gomez, Ivan Zhang, and Nick Frosst.

History 
In 2017, a team of researchers at Google Brain, which included Aidan Gomez, published a paper called "Attention is All You Need," which introduced the transformer machine learning architecture, setting state-of-the-art performance on a variety of natural language processing tasks. Gomez and Nick Frosst, another researcher at Google Brain, founded Cohere along with Ivan Zhang, with whom Gomez had done research at FOR.ai. All of the co-founders also attended University of Toronto. On May 4, 2021, Cohere officially launched. They also announced that they had been working with a small number of test customers, including Ada Support, a chatbot support service-provider. In November 2021, Google Cloud announced that they would be partnering with Cohere. Google Cloud would help power Cohere's platform using their robust infrastructure, and Cloud's TPUs would be used by Cohere for the development and deployment of their products.

Funding 
On September 7th, 2021, Cohere announced that they had raised $40 million in Series A funding led by Index Ventures; Index Ventures partner Mike Volpi also joined Cohere's board. The round also included Radical Ventures, Section 32, and AI-experts Geoffrey Hinton, Fei-Fei Li, Pieter Abbeel, and Raquel Urtasun.

See also 

 Babelnet
 vidby
 Deepl

References 

Natural language processing software
Companies based in Toronto